The Ven Max Leon  Godden, MA (25 November 1923 – 1 March 2000) was Archdeacon of Lewes from 1972  until 1975; and of Lewes and Hastings from then until 1988.

He was born on 25 November  1923  and educated at The Judd School and  Worcester College, Oxford. After World War II service with the RAFVR he was ordained in 1953 and began his career with curacies in Cuckfield and Brighton.  He was Vicar of Hangleton from 1957 to 1962  and then of Glynde until 1982.

He died on  1 March 2000.

Notes
 

1923 births
People educated at The Judd School
Alumni of Worcester College, Oxford
Royal Air Force Volunteer Reserve personnel of World War II
Archdeacons of Lewes
Archdeacons of Lewes & Hastings
2000 deaths
People from Glynde